Der Aktionär (German: The Shareholder) is a German language weekly business and finance magazine published in Germany. The headquarters of the magazine is in Kulmbach.

History and profile
Der Aktionär was started in late 1996 as a successor to a business magazine entitled Bulle & Bär. Bernd Förtsch is its founder who also served as its editor-in-chief. The magazine is published by the Börsenmedien AG owned by Förtsch. It was published monthly until 2000 when its frequency was switched to weekly.

Der Aktionär focuses on news about stock market. Olaf Hordenbach served as the editor-in-chief of the magazine.

In the first quarter of 2000 Der Aktionär sold 140,000 copies. In June 2000 the magazine reached a peak circulation figure with 200,000 copies. For the first quarter of 2005 the circulation of the magazine was 33,963 copies, making it the fifth best-selling weekly business publication in Germany. The circulation of the magazine was 29,536 copies in the first half of 2011.

See also
List of magazines in Germany

References

External links
 

1996 establishments in Germany
Business magazines published in Germany
German-language magazines
Magazines established in 1996
Monthly magazines published in Germany
Weekly magazines published in Germany